Tri County Area Schools is a school district headquartered in Sand Lake, Michigan. It serves sections of Kent, Montcalm, and Newaygo counties. It serves Sand Lake, Howard City, and Pierson as well as Pierson Township and Reynolds Township.

History
The district was a consolidation of the Sand Lake and Howard City school boards. It came into existence on April 3, 1962, the day members of those communities voted in favor of consolidating their schools; 415 voted, with 366 favoring consolidation. The consolidated schools began operation in fall 1962. Impetus for consolidation occurred when the State of Michigan adopted new standards for education which required school systems to spend additional funds.

Schools
 Tri County High School - Pierson Township
 Tri County Middle School - Pierson Township
 MacNaughton Elementary School - Howard City
 Sand Lake Elementary School - Sand Lake
 Edgerton Building - Howard City
 Includes: Tri County Preschool, TC Developmental Preschool, Howard City Head Start, and Success Virtual Learning Center as well as the alternative education programs.

References

External links
 Tri County Area Schools
Education in Kent County, Michigan
Education in Montcalm County, Michigan
Education in Newaygo County, Michigan
School districts in Michigan
1962 establishments in Michigan
School districts established in 1962